The Shrine of Our Lady of Altötting, also known as the Chapel of Grace, is the national shrine of Bavaria dedicated to the Blessed Virgin Mary. It is known for the many healings which are said to have taken place there, and is commonly called the Lourdes of Germany.

The octagonal chapel which houses the image of Our Lady dates to about A.D. 660, and is the oldest Marian shrine in Germany. The image of Mary venerated there is a Black Madonna of great antiquity (possibly about 1330), carved from lindenwood. The shrine became a popular pilgrim destination when it became known for the miraculous recovery in 1489 of a young boy who had been drowned, after his mother laid his body before the image and prayed to the Blessed Mother for a miracle.

Many of the votive offerings which have been given to the shrine over the centuries are displayed in the porch encircling the church. Also to be seen are the small, silver urns in which many members of the German nobility would have their hearts placed after their deaths to be brought here.

The shrine has been served by the Capuchin friars for centuries. One member of the Order, Brother Conrad of Parzham, O.F.M. Cap., (1818–1894) served there as porter for over 40 years. During his lifetime of service he developed a reputation for holiness and miraculous healings. He has been declared a saint by the Catholic Church.

The shrine was honored by a visit by Pope John Paul II in November 1980. He was accompanied by Cardinal Joseph Ratzinger, who was born in a nearby town. On 11 September 2006, Ratzinger, newly elected as Pope Benedict XVI, returned to the shrine and donated the episcopal ring he had worn while he was the Archbishop of Munich. The ring is now a part of the scepter held by the Blessed Virgin.

See also 
 List of Jesuit sites

References

External links 

 Gnadenort Altötting (in German)

Altotting
Altotting
Altotting
Altötting
Roman Catholic chapels in Germany
Roman Catholic shrines in Germany
Altötting (district)